South London Crematorium and Streatham Park Cemetery is a cemetery and crematorium on Rowan Road in Streatham Vale.  It has always been privately owned and managed and is now part of the Dignity plc group . The South London Crematorium is situated within the cemetery grounds and opened in 1936.

History
Streatham Park Cemetery is laid out in a grid pattern and opened as the Great Southern Cemetery in 1909 but was originally planned in 1890 to match the Great Northern Cemetery that opened in 1861 in Southgate. The cemetery buildings included a lodge, an Anglican Chapel and a small Roman Catholic chapel designed by John Bannen who also designed the Crematorium. The Crematorium had been planned from 1913 but was not built until 1936, the delay owing to the start of World War I. The cemetery lodge and Roman Catholic chapel have since been demolished while the original Anglican chapel later re-opened as the cemetery office. The cemetery has various gardens of remembrance, including rose gardens. Frederick Field (died 1923), a founder of the cemetery, is buried here.

The cemetery has a long connection with the Variety Artistes' Benevolent Fund (VABF), with about 200 variety artistes and music hall performers buried here between 1921 and 1944. A Chapel of Remembrance was added in 1958 at the request of the VABF. Up to World War II the cemetery accounted for one fifth of all burials in South London. The cemetery has a large number of burials from World War I (118) and World War II (290) which are maintained by the Commonwealth War Graves Commission (CWGC) and has a Cross of Sacrifice and Screen Wall Memorial, the latter commemorating casualties of both wars who are buried in this cemetery in graves which could not be marked by headstones. After World War II another wing was added to the memorial on which are commemorated the names of 123 personnel who died during that conflict and were cremated at the South London Crematorium, which is situated within the cemetery.

South London Crematorium
South London Crematorium was opened in 1936 on the site of Streatham Park Cemetery. Chapel can accommodate larger funerals and offers a service time of 45 minutes, which is longer than many other crematoria. Gardens of remembrance feature a variety of personalised memorials and mausoleum burials.

Streatham Park Cemetery
Famous names to have been buried here include the internationally renowned singer, Dorothy Squires, and comedian Tom Costello.

Streatham Jewish Cemetery

Streatham Jewish Cemetery opened in 1915 as a section of Streatham Park Cemetery. The majority of burials here are those of Ashkenazi Jews of eastern European origin who settled in the Soho area of London working as tailors, cabinetmakers, shopkeepers, etc. A small section of Streatham Park Cemetery is reserved for members of the South London Liberal Synagogue. This cemetery contains the Commonwealth war graves of 13 service personnel from World War II.

Notable burials
 Brian Barder
 Wilfrid Brambell
 Norman Clapham, variety artist and radio comedian
 Tom Costello
 Arthur Henry Cross VC
 Desmond Dekker
 Daisy Dormer
 June Duprez
 Gus Elen
 Florrie Forde
 Will Hay
 William Jex
 Frank Howard Kirby VC, CBE, DCM
 Charlie Kunz
 Lupino Lane
 Tom Leamore
 Olive Morris
 Nellie Navette
 Dan Rolyat
 Jack Spurling (1870–1933) Marine Artist
 Dorothy Squires
 Joseph Tabrar
 Ben Warriss

References

External links
 

Crematoria in England
Cemeteries in London
1909 establishments in England
Anglican cemeteries in the United Kingdom
Burials at Streatham Park Cemetery
1894 establishments in England
Gothic Revival architecture in London
History of the London Borough of Lambeth
Commonwealth War Graves Commission cemeteries in England
Streatham